Open Bakery (Åpent Bakeri) is a Norwegian bakery chain. The first store was opened in June, 1998 at Inkognito Terrasse (a shopping center in downtown Oslo) by Øyvind Lofthus and Emmanuel Rang.

At Christmas in 2001, they expanded to Briskeby. A year later they acquired "Plaza Bakeri" at Damplassen, where they bake and sell bread.

In early autumn of 2005, they opened "Blings" (a sandwich bar) at St.Olavs Plass. In late autumn of 2007 they moved their main production to Maridalsein 87, on the banks of the Akerselva. Here they currently bake most of their bread and pastries. During the same period, they opened a third shop at Torshov, and in 2008 they opened a fourth shop in Parkveien.
About two years later, in 2010, they opened a Pizzeria on the premises at Torshov, called Lofthus Samvirkelag.

Bakeries of Norway
Food and drink companies of Norway